Psilorhynchus balitora or Balitora minnow is a species of torrent minnow found in South Asia. It is found in the drainage basins of the Ganges and the Brahmaputra in eastern Nepal, northeast Bangladesh and adjacent West Bengal and northwest Assam. It can be found in hill streams and in rapids with substrates consisting of pebbles or sand, preferring hard substrates. It is exported as an aquarium fish.

References

Fish of Bangladesh
balitora
Taxa named by Francis Buchanan-Hamilton
Fish described in 1822